General elections were held in Sweden on 16 September 1979. The centre-right alliance won the election with a margin of 8,404 votes.

National results

Results by region

Percentage share

By votes

Results by constituencies

Percentage share

By votes

Results by municipalities

Blekinge

Dalarna

Kopparberg County

Gotland

Gävleborg

Halland

Jämtland

Jönköping

Kalmar

Kronoberg

Norrbotten

Skåne

Skåne was divided into the two counties of Kristianstad and Malmöhus. The latter county had two separate constituencies; the Fyrstadskretsen (the four-city constituency) and the rural part of Malmöhus.

Kristianstad

Malmö area
Four-city-constituency

Malmöhus

Stockholm

Stockholm (city)

Stockholm County

Södermanland

Uppsala

Värmland

Västerbotten

Västernorrland

Västmanland

Västra Götaland
Västra Götaland County did in 1979 consist of three separate counties; Göteborg och Bohuslän, Skaraborg and Älvsborg. The city of Gothenburg and the Bohuslän part of the county were divided into separate constituencies as well as Älvsborg being divided into a northern and southern part.

Bohuslän

Gothenburg

Skaraborg

Älvsborg N

Älvsborg S

Örebro

Östergötland

References

General elections in Sweden